Operation Blessing International Relief and Development Corporation (OB) is a non-profit 501(c)(3) humanitarian organization founded in the United States. Beginning in 1978, OBI has worked in more than 90 countries and throughout the U.S. Implementing programs that provide disaster relief, medical aid, clean water, hunger relief, community development and orphan care, Operation Blessing is governed by a national board of directors.

History 
Founded on November 14, 1978 by businessman and televangelist Pat Robertson, Operation Blessing was originally set up to help struggling individuals and families by matching their needs for items such as clothing, appliances, and vehicles with donated items from viewers of The 700 Club, Robertson's daily television program. Coordinating with local churches and other organizations, OBI expanded their matching funds program to also include food provisions and financial assistance for low-income families. In 1990, Operation Blessing began moving from individual assistance to helping fund outreach centers across the U.S. who provide a broad, community impact through their partnerships with local ministries, food pantries, and shelters. Internationally, OBI continued to expand its medical, hunger and disaster relief efforts and, in 1986, Operation Blessing International Relief and Development Corporation was officially incorporated as a 501(c)(3) nonprofit organization.

Activities 
 
According to the organization's official website, Operation Blessing's mission statement is "...to demonstrate God's love by alleviating human need and suffering in the United States and around the world." Operation Blessing operates on an ongoing basis in dozens of countries around the world, implementing programs that provide strategic disaster relief, medical aid, hunger relief, clean water and community development.

Disaster relief 
Specializing in disaster relief, Operation Blessing has most recently been involved in domestic relief work for victims of severe flooding in Nebraska, tornadoes in Alabama, and Hurricanes Michael and Florence in Florida and North Carolina. Internationally, Operation Blessing is helping victims of the humanitarian crisis in Venezuela and Cyclone Idai victims in East Africa.

In the wake of a devastating outbreak of the Zika virus in Latin America and the Caribbean, Operation Blessing employed juvenile turtles, fish and copepods to eat mosquito larvae before the insects can spread the virus. Operation Blessing is also fighting the spread of Zika through education, mosquito nets and insect repellent to protect the most vulnerable, especially pregnant women and their unborn children.

Operation Blessing also provided relief during the April 2015 Nepal earthquake, and following the 2013 Typhoon Haiyan in the Philippines, the 2013 Moore tornado in Oklahoma and the tornado outbreak of November 17, 2013 in Illinois, Hurricanes Sandy and Isaac, the 2011 Japan earthquake and tsunami; the 2011 Horn of Africa famine; 2011 tornadoes in Virginia, Alabama, and Missouri; the 2010-2011 Haiti cholera outbreak; and the 2010 Haiti earthquake.

Additionally, Operation Blessing funded relief and recovery efforts in response to war torn Iraq, Syria, Israel, South Sudan, Mali, Somalia, and Lebanon;

Previously, Operation Blessing also aided disaster victims in the wake of the 2004 Indian Ocean earthquake (Indonesian tsunami), as well as recovery efforts in the areas affected by Hurricane Katrina; and the Niger food crisis.

Medical aid 
Internationally, Operation Blessing medical teams offer free medical care (general medical, optical, dental and surgical services) and medicine to impoverished families, many of whom cannot afford such treatment or live in rural areas without regular access to health clinics. They are also developing teams of community health workers to help prevent and detect illnesses and diseases in rural villages as well as conduct insecticide-treated bed net distributions for children and pregnant women to reduce the risk of being bitten by malaria-carrying mosquitoes.

Clean water 
Operation Blessing teams drill water wells in impoverished communities to provide villagers with an accessible clean water source, preventing many water-borne diseases and reducing the amount of time women and children spend collecting water. In high altitude areas where wells are not an option, cisterns installed by Operation Blessing collect and store rainwater. Operation Blessing also installs large water purification systems that purify up to 10,000 gallons of water a day, often used during disasters or for high volume areas like hospitals.

Operation Blessing also manufactures chlorine to disinfect water supplies for hospitals, including the largest hospital in Juba, South Sudan, and Mirebalais Hospital in Haiti. Additional chlorine production is aiding the effort to fight Ebola in Liberia. In several developing countries, Operation Blessing distributes PackH2O water backpacks, installs rural community water systems, and even uses desalination technology to turn seawater into drinking water.

Hunger relief 
In the United States, Operation Blessing's Hunger Strike Force trucks deliver an average of almost 2 million pounds of food and product each week to local ministries, food pantries, shelters, and more across America. Internationally, Operation Blessing's food distributions are helping to fight hunger and reduce malnutrition by providing emergency food relief to children and families in crisis. Further, food security efforts like grain banks, agriculture training, and fish farms are working to establish long-term hunger relief in areas affected by drought, famine and poverty.

Microenterprise 
Microenterprise projects and loans are helping to equip men and women with marketable job skills and the resources needed to open small businesses in countries like Honduras, the Philippines, Peru and India. Skills training courses in electrical work and baking, as well as community development initiatives such as vegetable gardens and sewing centers are helping to improve the living conditions of impoverished families and develop stronger communities.

Vulnerable children 
Operation Blessing's Bless-A-Child programs provide nutrition, education, medical care, and more for vulnerable children while also aiding HIV/AIDS orphans, street children living in poverty, and those rescued from child trafficking.

Partnerships 
Operation Blessing partners with numerous other organizations and nonprofits, including Mayo Clinic of Minnesota, International Justice Mission, Free Wheelchair Mission, and Tide Loads of Hope. OBI also conducted annual food distributions with professional sports teams such as the Kansas City Chiefs, Kansas City Royals, Washington Redskins, and Jacksonville Jaguars.

Affiliation 
Operation Blessing is a member of the Association of Evangelical Relief and Development Organizations (AERDO) and is registered with the Federal Emergency Management Agency (FEMA) and the United States Agency for International Development (USAID). OBI is also a national member of the National Voluntary Organizations Active in Disaster (NVOAD), Combined Federal Campaign (CFC), Christian Service Charities, Christian Service Organizations of America (CSOA), the Global Compassion Network, the Virginia Trucking Association, and the American Trucking Associations (ATA).

Financial accountability 
Operation Blessing is a member of the Evangelical Council for Financial Accountability (ECFA), and is audited annually by KPMG, LLP.

Controversy 

After making emotional pleas in 1994 on The 700 Club for cash donations to Operation Blessing to support airlifts of refugees from Rwanda to Zaire, it was later discovered, by a reporter from The Virginian-Pilot, that Operation Blessing's planes were transporting diamond-mining equipment for the Robertson-owned African Development Corporation, a venture Robertson had established in cooperation with Zaire's dictator, Mobutu Sese Seko, whom Robertson had befriended earlier in 1993. According to Operation Blessing documents, Robertson personally owned the planes used for Operation Blessing airlifts.

Robertson continues to state that Operation Blessing was largely responsible for providing aid to Rwanda following the 1994 genocide, even after an official investigation into Operation Blessing described it as a "fraudulent and deceptive" operation that provided almost no aid. A 1999 report concluded that, whilst Robertson's request for donations to Operation Blessing had been misleading, they were not an intentional attempt to commit fraud. A September 2013 article in The Guardian stated that all Operation Blessing volunteers did was recite Bible passages at dying refugees. Robertson was accused of taking credit for work that was actually done by Médecins Sans Frontières. 

In December 2013, The Guardian issued an apology to Operation Blessing, retracting many of their accusations, acknowledging that they had not mentioned a further report that cleared Operation Blessing of any wrongdoing, and agreeing to make a donation to Operation Blessing's "relief efforts for victims of the typhoon in the Philippines."

References

External links 

 

International charities